Tomb KV7 was the final resting place of ancient Egyptian Pharaoh Ramesses II ("Ramesses the Great") of the Nineteenth Dynasty.

Location
It is located in the Valley of the Kings opposite the tomb of his sons, KV5, and near to the tomb of his son and successor Merenptah, KV8.

Decoration and Layout
KV7  follows the bent-axis plan of tombs of the earlier Eighteenth Dynasty: the entrance to the tomb is dug into the Theban limestone hillside near the valley floor. The first gate, Gate B, has decorations on the lintel "of the solid disk flanked by Nephthys and Isis, representations of Ma'at kneeling above the heraldic plants of Lower and Upper Egypt, and door jambs contain[ing] the names and epithets of the King."

"The passage descends for about 58 meters (190 feet) into the bedrock at an angle that varies between 12 and 22 degrees." Gates C and D are painted with texts from the Litany of Re and images of the four sons of Horus respectively.

The passage opens into a small well chamber, then into a pillared chamber designated F. F has two directions. Turning right, are two rooms that haven't been fully excavated. Going straight, the passage "continues approximately level for another 12 meters (39 feet), then turns to the right and terminates in the burial chamber J, which is partly carved in a layer of Esna shale." J has four doorways leading to two small (Ja and Jb) and two larger rooms (Jc and Jd), the last of these having two offshoots of its own.Other decorations in the tomb include images of funerary objects intended to help the pharaoh in the afterlife; and scenes and passages from the Book of Gates, the Book of the Dead, the Book of the Heavenly Cow, the Amduat, the Litany of Re and the Opening of the Mouth. Unlike other tombs in the area, Tomb KV7 was placed in an unusual location and has been badly damaged by the flash floods that periodically sweep through the valley. Because of this, much of the decoration has been damaged beyond repair.

History
Christian Leblanc, as part of a joint Franco-Egyptian mission in 1991, determined that construction of the tomb was begun before the end of Ramesses II's second year on the throne and took no more than ten or twelve years to complete.

After the tomb was almost broken into, as depicted in the Strike Papyrus of the 29th year of Ramesses III, Ramesses II's mummy was moved to the tomb of his father Seti I, then to the mummy cache in DB320.

Tourists during the Third Intermediate and Roman periods left "abundant quantities" of potsherds in the burial chamber and nearby antechamber. Greek tourists, like "Herakleos, Echeboulos of Rhodes, Deilos and a certain Se(l)aminion of Cyprus", carved their names into the first corridor.

The British consul Henry Salt and, in 1829, Champollion both worked to clear earth that had filled in the tomb.

It was still only by crawling that Richard Lepsius was able to reach the end of the tomb in 1844–5, exploring the accessible rooms and planning the underground complex, the walls of which, he noted, had been badly damaged by silt and gravel. Lepsius not only provided the first precise plan of the tomb but also guessed the existence, to the east of the pillared chamber (F), of two rooms which are still inaccessible. Only much later was Lepsius' plan revised by the team of the Theban Mapping Project of the University of Berkeley.

When Theodore Davis obtained the concession for the Valley of the Kings, he and Harry Burton undertook excavations of the tomb (1913–14), the work renewed by Howard Carter (1917–21), not only inside but also outside the tomb. It was during these undertakings that the first remains of the royal funerary furniture were revealed, notably those pieces now in the collections of the Metropolitan Museum of Art in New York and the British Museum."

References

Reeves, N., & Wilkinson, R. H. The Complete Valley of the Kings. London: Thames and Hudson, 1996.
Siliotti, A. Guide to the Valley of the Kings and to the Theban Necropolises and Temples. Cairo: A. A. Gaddis, 1996.
Leblanc, Christian. "The Tomb of Ramesses II and Remains of his Funerary Treasure." Egyptian Archaeology; 10 (1997): 11–13.

Buildings and structures completed in the 13th century BC
Valley of the Kings
Ramesses II